Danny Michael Kelly (born 18 October 1990) is an English-born Irish footballer, who plays for St Ives Town.

Career
After spells with the youth teams of Cambridge United, Peterborough United and Histon, Kelly joined Norwich City in 2007. Successful performances in the youth and reserve teams saw him rewarded with a one-year professional contract in 2009. However, he never played for The Canaries first team; the closest he came were five appearances on the bench. He joined League Two side Barnet in the summer of 2010 and made his debut against Chesterfield. He made a further three substitute appearances before being sidelined for a number of months with an ankle ligament injury.

Kelly was sent on loan after recovering from injury to Conference South club Dover Athletic for one month, playing in four games. He then signed for Conference National side Eastbourne Borough on loan in March 2011, going on to make 12 appearances for the club both as a striker and at centre-back.

Kelly was released by Barnet in May 2011. He joined Cambridge City on a free transfer on 26 August 2011, but left to find a new club after scoring 10 goals in 25 games.

Kelly then moved to Australia and played for Bentleigh Greens in the Victorian Premier League, as well as South Springvale in the Victorian State League Division 2.

In 2014, Kelly returned to England and re-joined Cambridge City. He joined St Ives Town for the 2016–17 season.

At international level he has captained the Republic of Ireland under-19 side.

References

External links

1990 births
Living people
Association football forwards
English footballers
Republic of Ireland association footballers
Norwich City F.C. players
Barnet F.C. players
Dover Athletic F.C. players
Eastbourne Borough F.C. players
Bentleigh Greens SC players
South Springvale SC players
Cambridge City F.C. players
St Ives Town F.C. players
English Football League players
National League (English football) players
Southern Football League players
Victorian Premier League players
Expatriate soccer players in Australia
Republic of Ireland youth international footballers
English people of Irish descent